Eupithecia rubeni is a moth in the family Geometridae. It is found in Mongolia and Russia.

References

Moths described in 1976
rubeni
Moths of Asia